Silver Spoon Set (also known as The Dauphins) is a 1960 Italian and French drama film directed and written by Francesco Maselli. The film stars Claudia Cardinale. Shot in Ascoli Piceno, Italy.

Cast
Claudia Cardinale as Fedora Santini
Gérard Blain as Anselmo Foresi
Betsy Blair as  Countess Rita Cherè
Anna Maria Ferrero as  Marina
Sergio Fantoni as  Dr. Mario Corsi
Tomas Milian as  Alberto De Matteis
Claudio Gora as  Ridolfi
Antonella Lualdi as  Elsa Foresi
Enzo Garinei as  Guglielmo Bodoni
Tina Lattanzi

Gallery

Censorship
When I Delfini was first released in Italy in 1960 the Committee for the Theatrical Review of the Italian Ministry of Cultural Heritage and Activities rated the film suitable for people 16 years and older. In order for the film to be screened publicly, the Committee recommended the removal of the scene in which Alberto and Fedora are kissing each other in bed because the kiss was considered excessively lustful. The reason for the age restriction, cited in the official documents, is that the subject and the scenes of the movie are considered inappropriate to
the sensitivity of a minor. The official document number is: 32912, it was signed on 20 September 1960 by Minister Renzo Helfer

External links
 
 Database of the documents produced by the Committee for the Theatrical Review of The Italian Ministry of Cultural Heritage and Activities, from 1944 to 2000.

1960 films
Italian drama films
French drama films
1960s Italian-language films
1960s French-language films
1960 drama films
Films directed by Francesco Maselli
Films scored by Giovanni Fusco
Lux Film films
1960s Italian films
1960s French films